David Godfrey Pettifor  (9 March 1945 – 16 October 2017) was the Isaac Wolfson Professor of Metallurgy at the University of Oxford from 1992 to 2011. He was also a Fellow of St Edmund Hall, Oxford.

He was the author of a book entitled Bonding and Structure of Molecules and Solids (Oxford University Press).  He created "structure maps" which determine which crystal structure an alloy will form. He was a world authority on materials modelling and helped established the Oxford Materials Modelling Laboratory.

He held a BSc from the University of Witwatersrand in South Africa and a PhD from the University of Cambridge, supervised by Volker Heine.

He was made a CBE in  the Queen's Birthday Honours in 2005. In 1999, he received the Royal Society Armourers and Brasiers' Medal. Other awards include the William Hume-Rothery Award and the Hume-Rothery Prize.

He died on 16 October 2017.

Bibliography

References

External links
 Home page

Fellows of the Royal Society
Fellows of St Edmund Hall, Oxford
Isaac Wolfson Professors of Metallurgy
Commanders of the Order of the British Empire
British metallurgists
1945 births
2017 deaths
Alumni of the University of Cambridge